Untold: Crimes & Penalties is a 2021 American biographical documentary film made for Netflix and directed by Chapman Way and Maclain Way. The film was released on August 31, 2021.

Summary 
The film is the fourth installment in the nine-part Untold documentary film series. Its story focuses on the now defunct United Hockey League (UHL) ice hockey team the Danbury Trashers, which was bought by James Galante, a mafia-connected trash kingpin and associate of the Genovese crime family who gifted the team to his 17-year-old son, A. J., making him the president and general manager of the team.

References

External links 
 
 Excerpt
 

2021 films
2021 documentary films
Documentary films about sportspeople
Documentary films about crime in the United States
Mafia crime families
Genovese crime family
American sports documentary films
American biographical films
Biographical documentary films
2020s English-language films
2020s American films
Netflix original documentary films